"I Forgot" is a song by American singer Lionel Richie. An English language version of the French song "L'important c'est d'aimer" (1999), originally written and performed by Pascal Obispo, it was adpated by Richie and Patrice Guirao  for his sixth studio album Renaissance (2000) and appeared on several selected versions of the album. The song was released as the album's third single in Belgium and France, also serving as Renaissances fourth single in United Kingdom. It peaked at number 18 in the Wallonian region of Belgium and reached the top forty of the UK Singles Chart.

Track listings

Notes
 signifies a co-producer

Credits and personnel
Credits adapted from the album's liner notes.

 Patrice Guirao –  writer
 Pascal Obispo – writer
 Lionel Richie – vocals, writer

Charts

References

2001 singles
Lionel Richie songs
Songs written by Lionel Richie
2000 songs